Aste or ASTE may refer to:

 Aste (rapper) (born 1985), Finnish rapper
 Aste, Estonia, a borough in Kaarma Parish, Saare County, Estonia
 Aste village, Estonia, A village in Kaarma Parish, Saare County, Estonia
 Aste, India, a village in Belgaum district, Karnataka, India
 Aircraft & Systems Testing Establishment, a unit of the Indian Air Force
 Atacama Submillimeter Telescope Experiment
 Succinylglutamate desuccinylase or AstE, an enzyme
 Association for Science Teacher Education, an affiliate of the National Science Teaching Association

See also
 Aste-Béon, a commune in the Pyrénées-Atlantiques department of France